Judith Malika Liberman (born 1978) is a French storyteller, writer and teacher currently living in Turkey. When she was 14, she learned storytelling in a French commune and has gone on to reintroduce the telling of Anatolian fairy tales in Turkey.

Early life and education
Judith Malika Liberman was born in Paris, France, in 1978. Her parents moved from the city to a rural area in the 1970s following the back-to-the-land movement. The family established a weaver commune. Liberman grew up in the commune, which was frequently visited by jugglers and storytellers who provided entertainment in rural areas. That era saw the revival of the storytelling tradition in France and Liberman's mother co-founded a storytelling society. In the commune, songs were sung and tales were told during evening gatherings by the fireplace. Liberman learned storytelling at the age of 14.

Liberman received a master's degree in linguistics at Sorbonne University in Paris. She studied acting at Pomona College in Claremont, California, United States, and took lessons in storytelling at the Conservatoire de Paris.

Career
Liberman had plans to settle in the United States before she was appointed cultural attaché of France to Turkey in Ankara. She stayed in Turkey after completing her one-year duty.

She taught academic writing at Middle East Technical University in Ankara for seven years, followed by English at Koç University in Istanbul. A certified yoga teacher, she implements parts of her interest in storytelling in her practice. She had close connections to the Intangible Cultural Heritage Museum in Ankara. She worked with folklorists from Ankara's Gazi University and took part in various projects, conferences and festivals. She also trained storytellers in helping heal pediatric patients by using the oral narrative.

Liberman has given performances and seminars of fairy tale narration in many countries, including Turkey. Living in Turkey since 2004, she reintroduced the tradition of fairy tale narration in that country by teaching Anatolian fairy tales. Since 2014, she has presented a weekly radio program titled Masal Bu Ya ("This is the Tale") aired on NTV Radio. She gives night performances of storytelling with a different themes in the  "Nazım Hikmet Cultural Center" in Şişli, Istanbul every month. She can narrate in a near-perfect Turkish accent. In March 2018, she presented Turkish traditional humorous fairy tales introducing Nasreddin Hodja at the Toronto International Storytelling Festival in Canada.

Liberman authored her first book, Masal Terapisi ("Storytelling Therapy"), in 2015. Two more books of hers,  Masallarla Yola Çık ("The Journey Starts with a Tale") and Önce Hayal ("Imagination First"), followed in 2017 and 2019 respectively. She was also a consultor for the 2015 Turkish film Bir Varmış Bir Yokmuş ("Once Upon A Time").

Works

References

Living people
1978 births
Diplomats from Paris
Paris-Sorbonne University alumni
Pomona College alumni
Conservatoire de Paris alumni
Actresses from Paris
French storytellers
Women storytellers
Fictional storytellers
French entertainers
French expatriates in Turkey
Academic staff of Middle East Technical University
Academic staff of Koç University
Turkish-language writers
French fiction writers
21st-century French writers
21st-century French women writers
Cultural attachés